The New Hope Baptist Church at 1202 S. Sheppard Street in Chickasha, Oklahoma is a historic Baptist church building. It was built in 1939 and added to the National Register in 2003.

Its building is a one-story east-facing front-gabled red brick building and has a square corner tower.  It has a concrete block education wing with a basement which was added at the rear in about 1948.

It was deemed significant for its association with the growth and development of the African American community in Chickasha.  According to its NRHP nomination "It stands as the best extant symbol of
African American socio-political unity in Chickasha during a period when de facto and dejure segregation alienated
blacks from the greater social institutions of Chickasha. An entire black community, alive with homes, businesses,
churches, and social clubs developed in Chickasha. This community, while by necessity interacting with the larger city
in which it thrived, was for the most part an entity unto itself, lacking only an official political voice. The glue that held
this community together was the church. Denominational and doctrinal differences aside, the black churches of
Chickasha provided the spiritual, educational, social, and political voice of the community."

References

Baptist churches in Oklahoma
Churches on the National Register of Historic Places in Oklahoma
Churches completed in 1939
Buildings and structures in Grady County, Oklahoma
National Register of Historic Places in Grady County, Oklahoma